The Al-Jalila Field is an oil field located offshore of the United Arab Emirates in the Persian Gulf. The oil field was discovered in early 2010 and production was expected to begin in late 2014, according to the UAE government. The oil field was named after the daughter of Mohammed bin Rashid Al Maktoum, the UAE's current Prime Minister. The Al-Jalila platform is currently under construction and is being operated by Dubai Petroleum (NOC).

References

Oil fields of the United Arab Emirates
Geography of the United Arab Emirates